The Flesh and Blood Show is a 1972 British slasher film directed and produced by Pete Walker, and starring Ray Brooks, Jenny Hanley, and Luan Peters. It follows a group of actors being stalked and murdered by an unseen assailant while rehearsing a play at a derelict seaside theatre.

Originally released in the United Kingdom September 1972 and featuring an ending sequence shot in 3-D, film achieved a minor cult following in the years since its release.

Plot
Actresses and roommates Carol Edwards and Jane Pruitt are among a group of unemployed actors who are assembled by an anonymous producer to appear in a stage play titled The Flesh and Blood Show. The performers arrive at the Dome Theatre, a dreary abandoned theatre on a seaside pier, where they are scheduled to begin rehearsals. Carol and Jane are met by fellow actors John and Tony, as well as Mike, the play's director. Inside the theatre, the group find actors Simon and Angela, who arrived prior. Yet to arrive is Julia Dawson, an actress who has recently forged a film career.

With local hotels closed due to it being the off-season, the cast are required to stay in the theatre during rehearsals. On the first night, Carol and Tony spend the night together, leaving Jane to room with Angela, who makes sexual advances toward her, which John witnesses. In the middle of the night, Angela goes missing and the group are awoken by the sounds of a woman screaming. Mike finds Angela's severed head in the basement, along with her body, which lay on a prop guillotine. Mike keeps his discovery a secret from the others. Later, a gloved individual fondles Angela's severed head. Mike summons local police to investigate, but when they arrive, they find several mannequin heads, but no sight of Angela's body. Police assume Mike's claim to be imagined. Mike subsequently discovers a note apparently written by Angela in which she states she had to quit the play.

Julia subsequently arrives at the theatre in the middle of the night. The following morning, she accompanies Mike on a walk, and tells him she feels a sense of déjà vu while inside the theatre. Mike confesses his experience from the night before, when he found Angela's corpse, which then vanished. That night, after getting into a fight with Tony, Carol goes for a walk along the pier. She is approached by what appears to be a cloaked vagrant who begins to sexually assault her. Mike and Julia go to search for her, and hear her screaming. Carol is saved moments after the assailant brandishes a butcher knife, and he flees. Mike realizes after that John is now missing, and suspects he may have been Carol's attacker.

Meanwhile, actress Sarah Hales, who is staying with her aunt, Mrs. Saunders, nearby, is hired as a replacement for Angela. Sarah's aunt opens her home to the actors, allowing them to dine and bathe there during rehearsals. Mrs. Saunders, along with her friend Major Bell, recounts the Dome theatre's history to the actors, including a story about how actor Harry Mulligan, his deranged co-star Sir Arnold Gates, and Gates's wife, Pamela, all went missing there during World War II. The story piques Julia's interest, and she visits the local library to reviews newspaper articles about the disappearances.

Major Bell visits the theatre and startles Sarah in her dressing room. Bell requests to observe the actors' rehearsals, which Mike agrees to at a later date. Meanwhile, Carol goes to retrieve a costume from the basement, and is locked inside by Tony, pulling a prank. A figure with a flashlight approaches her in a corridor, illuminating two skeletal remains, before she is attacked. Two fisherman find Carol floating below the pier, severely injured, and she subsequently dies in hospital. Inspector Walsh investigates the murder, which Mike asserts was committed by the unhinged John, who is still missing. Walsh tells Mike that Angela never returned home. Later that evening, John's corpse is found floating down shore from the theatre, and it is determined he was bludgeoned to death and stabbed. John's estimated time of death suggests he could not have been Carol's attacker.

During a rehearsal, someone begins toying with the stage lights, illuminating Sarah's nude corpse seated in an upper wing of the theatre. Mike forces the actors to hide in the dressing room, while he hears the voice of a man reciting lines from Othello in the auditorium. The man emerges from the shadows, revealing himself to be Major Bell. In a flashback, it revealed that Bell—who is in fact Sir Arnold Gates—attacked his wife and co-star Harry after finding them having an affair. He then bound and gagged them, leaving them to starve to death in a locked room beneath the theatre, before departing with his young daughter. Gates wanders the theatre in a fugue state, reliving the night of his murders, and entering the dressing room where the actors are hiding. Inspector Walsh arrives moments later, and apprehends Gates. As Mike and the actors reflect on the events, it is revealed that Julia is in fact Gates's daughter, whom he abandoned after killing Pamela and Harry.

Cast

Production

Filming
The film was shot on location in Cromer, Norfolk. The seaside theatre in the film was the Pavilion Theatre in Cromer, England.

Music
The music was composed and conducted by Cyril Ornadel.

Release
The Flesh and Blood Show was released theatrically in the United Kingdom on 23 September 1972 by Tigon Films. The film's ending was originally filmed and shown in cinemas in 3-D. The film opened theatrically in the United States on 13 July 1973 in Boston, Massachusetts.

Critical response
Bill Gribron, writing for DVD Verdict, said, "This film could use all the inventive help it can get. Otherwise, it's as stiff as a British businessman's long-lamented upper lip". Ian Jane, of DVD Talk, wrote, "While The Flesh & Blood Show has definitely got its fair share of obvious flaws, it's nevertheless a fun and enjoyable horror movie with enough mildly sleazy thrills and odd characters to provide for some solid entertainment"

Home media
The film was released on DVD by Shriek Show, a division of Media Blasters, in 2006. The special features are a picture gallery, a trailer, and an interview with the director. Kino Lorber issued a Blu-ray edition in 2014 under their "Redemption Films" line, both as a standalone release, as well as in a multi-film set titled The Pete Walker Collection II, alongside Frightmare (1974), House of Mortal Sin (1976), and Home Before Midnight (1979).

Legacy
In the years since its release, the film achieved a small cult following.

The film's plot of young actors and actresses being murdered became a theme in the director's later work. His later horror films focused on youth and their culture being attacked by people who are older.

References

Sources

External links

1972 films
1972 horror films
1972 independent films
1970s 3D films
1970s English-language films
1970s slasher films
British 3D films
British exploitation films
British independent films
British horror films
British serial killer films
British slasher films
Films about actors
Films directed by Pete Walker
Films set in Brighton
Films set in a theatre
Films shot in Norfolk
1970s British films